Tågarp is a bimunicipal locality situated in Svalöv Municipality and Landskrona Municipality in Skåne County, Sweden with 431 inhabitants in 2010.

References 

Populated places in Landskrona Municipality
Populated places in Svalöv Municipality
Populated places in Skåne County